See the Whirl is the first and only album by Leeds post-punk band Delta 5.

Track listing
All tracks composed by Delta 5; except where indicated

Side A
"Innocenti" - 02:03
"Final Scene" - 02:42
"Circuit" - 01:59
"Open Life" - 03:39
"Trail" - 02:57
"Shadow" - 02:30
"Delta 5" - 02:05
"Anticipation" - 02:14
Side B
"Journey" - 02:54
"Make Up" (Delta 5, Jon Langford) - 02:51
"Triangle" - 03:34
"Waiting" - 02:29
"Telephone" - 04:23
"Different Fur" - 02:40

Personnel
Delta 5
Bethan Peters - bass, vocals
Ros Allen - bass, vocals
Kelvin Knight - drums, percussion
Alan Riggs - guitar, vocals
Julz Sale - vocals, guitar
with:
Michael McEvoy - piano, horn arrangements
Melv Jefferson - backing vocals, syndrums 
B.J. Cole - pedal steel guitar on "Triangle"
John Sidwell, Steve Bishop, Steve Sidwell - horns
Technical
Mike Stand, Tim Summerhayes - engineer
John Rule - tape operator
Joe Lyons - photographer

References

External links 

 

1981 debut albums
Delta 5 albums
Albums produced by Adam Kidron